The Supreme Court of Judicature Act 1873 (sometimes known as the Judicature Act 1873) was an Act of the Parliament of the United Kingdom in 1873. It reorganised the English court system to establish the High Court and the Court of Appeal, and also originally provided for the abolition of the judicial functions of the House of Lords with respect to England.  It would have retained those functions in relation to Scotland and Ireland for the time being. However, the Gladstone Liberal government fell in 1874 before the Act entered into force, and the succeeding Disraeli Conservative government suspended the entry into force of the Act by means of the Supreme Court of Judicature (Commencement) Act 1874 (37 & 38 Vict. c. 83) and the Supreme Court of Judicature Act 1875.

History
The legislation for the Judicature Act of 1873 was drafted by the Judicature Commission which was chaired by Lord Chancellor Hatherley. Other members of the commission included judge George Bramwell, lawyers Sir John Hollams, Sir Robert Collier, and John Burgess Karslake, and parliament member George Ward Hunt.

Liberal view
One of the reasons that the Liberal government under Gladstone wanted to abolish the judicial aspect of the House of Lords was that it was concerned for the poor quality of judges at this court. Judges at the House of Lords secured their position by mere virtue of the fact that their fathers were hereditary peers and so individuals would automatically inherit seats in the upper house rather than securing their position through merit. Therefore, some of the best lawyers in the land were prohibited from sitting as judges in the upper house simply because of their parentage.

Conservative view
However, under the Conservative government, the 1874 and 1875 Acts retained the judicial aspect of the House of Lords and ensured the quality of judicial appointments to the House of Lords by legislating under the Appellate Jurisdiction Act 1876, for the mechanism of law lords. The reigning monarch could appoint any individual to be a peer and thus a judge in the House of Lords. These judicial life peers would hold seats only for the duration of their life; their seat would not pass through their inheritance to their son. Thus, Queen Victoria and subsequent monarchs were able to appoint leading lawyers to adjudicate in the House of Lords by making them life peers.

Appellate Jurisdiction Act 1876
Lord Cairns, Disraeli's Lord Chancellor, sought to remove the House of Lords jurisdiction for Scottish and Irish appeals as well, which would have completely removed its judicial jurisdiction. However, the Lord Chancellor could not muster the necessary support in the Parliament for the Bill as originally proposed in 1874 or when it was reintroduced in 1875. Finally, when it became clear that the English legal profession was firmly opposed to the reform proposals, the Appellate Jurisdiction Act 1876 removed the provisions for the abolition of the judicial functions of the House of Lords, although it retained the provisions that established the High Court and the Court of Appeal.

See also
Judicature Act
Judicature Acts (1873 and 1875)

References

External links
 The Judicature Acts of 1873 and 1875 at the UK Parliament website

Further reading
Preston, Thomas. The Supreme Court of Judicature Act 1873. William Amer. Lincoln's Inn Gate. London. 1873.
Haynes, Freeman Oliver. The Supreme Court of Judicature Act 1873, with Explanatory Notes. 1874. Reviewed at "Reviews" (1874) 8 Irish Law Times and Solicitors Journal 483
Charley, William Thomas. "Supreme Court of Judicature Act, 1873". The New System of Practice and Pleading Under the Supreme Court of Judicature Acts, 1873 & 1875. Waterlow and Sons. London. 1875. Page 1 et seq.
Clowes, W. A Compendious Index to the Supreme Court of Judicature Act, 1873, 36 & 37 Vict. C. 66: And the Supreme Court of Judicature Act (1873) Amendment Act, 38 & 39 Vict. C. 77. Second Edition. Stevens and Sons. Chancery Lane. London. 1875. 
William Downes Griffith and Richard Loveland Loveland. "Supreme Court of Judicature Act 1873". The Supreme Court of Judicature Acts, 1873, 1875, & 1877: The Appellate Jurisdiction Act, 1876. And the Rules, Orders, and Costs Thereunder. Second Edition. Stevens and Haynes. Bell Yard, Temple Bar, London. 1877. Page 1 et seq.
Robert William Andrews and Arbuthnot Butler Stoney. "Supreme Court of Judicature Act, 1873". The Supreme Court of Judicature Acts, and the Appellate Jurisdiction Act, 1876. Reeves & Turner. Chancery Lane, London. 1880. Page 1 et seq.
Thomas Snow, Charles Burney and Francis A Stringer. "The Supreme Court of Judicature Act, 1873". The Annual Practice 1905. Sweet and Maxwell. Stevens and Sons. London. 1905. Volume 2. Page 405 et seq.
 O'Keefe, David. "Sir George Jessel and the Union of Judicature." American Journal of Legal History 26 (1982): 227+.

United Kingdom Acts of Parliament 1873
1873 in British law
Courts of England and Wales
High Court of Justice
Court of Appeal (England and Wales)
Civil procedure